Jerry Helms is an American North American champion bridge player and an American Contract Bridge League (ACBL) Grand Life Master.

Bridge accomplishments

Wins
 North American Bridge Championships (1)
 Grand National Teams (1) 2022

References

American contract bridge players
Living people
Year of birth missing (living people)